Olivér Nagy (born 30 January 1989) is a Hungarian football player who plays for Lipóti SK.

External links
 UEFA.com
 
 
 

1989 births
Living people
Sportspeople from Pécs
Hungarian footballers
Hungarian expatriate footballers
Association football midfielders
Pécsi MFC players
Újpest FC players
Paksi FC players
Szombathelyi Haladás footballers
CSM Ceahlăul Piatra Neamț players
Szigetszentmiklósi TK footballers
Gyirmót FC Győr players
Balassagyarmati SE footballers
III. Kerületi TUE footballers
Szolnoki MÁV FC footballers
Nemzeti Bajnokság I players
Nemzeti Bajnokság II players
Liga I players
Hungarian expatriate sportspeople in Romania
Expatriate footballers in Romania